Joseph Paul DeMaestri (December 9, 1928 – August 26, 2016), nicknamed "Froggy", was an American shortstop in Major League Baseball who played for the Chicago White Sox (1951), St. Louis Browns (1952), Philadelphia / Kansas City Athletics (1953–59) and New York Yankees (1960–61).

DeMaestri graduated a from Tamalpais High School in Mill Valley, California, and began his 15-year professional baseball career in the Boston Red Sox' organization in 1947. He was selected by the White Sox in the 1950 Rule 5 Draft. In an 11-season MLB career, DeMaestri was a .236 hitter with 813 hits, 49 home runs and 281 RBI in 1,121 games played. Defensively, he recorded a .967 fielding percentage. He played 905 of those games with the Athletics and made the American League All-Star team in 1957.

On July 8, 1955, at Briggs Stadium, DeMaestri collected six hits in six at bats in an 11-inning game against the Detroit Tigers.  All his hits were singles and he scored two runs, but Detroit won the contest, 11–8.

In December 1959, Demaestri was traded to the New York Yankees in the seven-player deal that famously brought Roger Maris to the Bronx Bombers. When the Yankees won the 1960 American League pennant, he appeared in his first and only World Series, getting into four games and collecting one hit, a single off Joe Gibbon of the Pittsburgh Pirates in the opening contest, in two at bats. 

In the eighth inning of Game 7, DeMaestri took over for regular Yankee shortstop Tony Kubek when Kubek was struck in the throat by a bad-hop ground ball hit by Bill Virdon; the play sparked a five-run Pittsburgh rally.  However, DeMaestri was off the field when, one inning later, Bill Mazeroski hit his famous walk-off homer against pitcher Ralph Terry. Dale Long had pinch hit for DeMaestri in the top of the ninth, and Clete Boyer had moved from third base to shortstop to take his place on defense.

See also

List of Major League Baseball single-game hits leaders

References

External links

 Interview with Joe DeMaestri at his Home in Novata, CA, 1995 - with Baseball Historian Norman L. Macht on The Sporting Blog

1928 births
2016 deaths
American League All-Stars
Baseball players from San Francisco
Birmingham Barons players
Chicago White Sox players
El Paso Texans players
Kansas City Athletics players
Major League Baseball shortstops
New York Yankees players
Oneonta Red Sox players
Philadelphia Athletics players
St. Louis Browns players
San Jose Red Sox players
Tamalpais High School alumni